Douglas C. McDougal (April 23, 1876 – January 20, 1964) was the 10th Assistant to the Major General Commandant of the Marine Corps.

Early years
McDougal was born April 23, 1876 in San Francisco, California and after joining the Marine Corps participated in numerous conflicts including the Philippine–American War, Spanish–American War and the Boxer Rebellion.

By the time he retired he had achieved the rank of Major General. He died January 20, 1964.

Awards and decorations
 Haiti
 Haitian Distinguished Service Medal
 Medal of Honor and Merit

 Nicaragua
 Medal of Distinction (Nicaragua)
 Medal of Merit (Nicaragua)

 United States
 Navy Distinguished Service Medal
 Spanish Campaign Medal
 Philippine Campaign Medal
 China Campaign Medal
 World War I Victory Medal
 Marine Corps Expeditionary Medal
 Dominican Campaign Medal
 Haitian Campaign Medal
 Nicaraguan Campaign Medal

See also

References

 

1876 births
1964 deaths
United States Marine Corps personnel of World War I
United States Marine Corps generals
United States Naval Academy alumni
United States Distinguished Marksman
Recipients of the Navy Distinguished Service Medal
American military personnel of the Spanish–American War
American military personnel of the Philippine–American War
People from San Francisco
Military personnel from California